BVerfGE 39,1 — Abortion I was a decision of the Federal Constitutional Court of Germany, addressing the issue of abortion in 1975, two years after the United States Supreme Court decision Roe v. Wade. The Court held that respect for human dignity requires the criminalization of abortion if it is not justified by imperative reasons called indications ("Indikationen"). There are several indications, most notably the medical indication, meaning that the life of the mother would be at risk if she had to carry the child to term, and the criminal indication, meaning that the child is the result of the mother being raped.

The decision considered the full range of arguments for abortion, both early (legalization had been a topic of debate in Germany since the turn of the century) and recent (used in other countries such as the United States and Britain that legalized abortion several years before). In particular, it specifically rejected the main points of reasoning in Roe v. Wade as well as its "term solution" as inconsistent with the constitutional guarantee of the right to life.  The Court held that the right to life, as guaranteed by Article 2, Paragraph 2 of the Basic Law, must extend to the life of the unborn when read in the light of the guarantee of human dignity as laid out in Article 1 of the Basic Law.

The reunification of Germany resulted in a significant revision of abortion laws, which liberalized them in many respects, although leaving them more restrictive than the East German laws which permitted abortion upon demand during the first twelve weeks of pregnancy. In the early 1990s, the Bundestag implemented a system where a woman having an abortion during the first three months of her pregnancy does not face legal sanctions if she undergoes mandatory counseling which has as one of its goals to present the case that the developing fetus is an independent human life, and obeys a 72-hour waiting period between counseling and the abortion. Later abortions are not punishable if medical reasons, such as possible harm to the woman from continued pregnancy, or a severely deformed fetus, indicate so.
   
In a second judgment in 1993, the Federal Constitutional Court struck down the 1992 relaxed restrictions on abortion. The Court considered that the defense of the unborn human beings' right to life necessarily implies prohibition. While penal measurements are needed, the constitutional mandate to protect unborn life can also include social, political, and welfare means. Therefore, the legislator removed the statement, that the unpunished arbortion within in twelve weeks would not be illegal, from the law.

References
Primary
 Text of decision BVerfGE 39, 1:

Secondary

 

Abortion case law
Abortion in Germany
Abortion
1975 in case law
1975 in West Germany